The California State University Maritime Academy (Cal Maritime or CSU Maritime Academy) is a public university in Vallejo, California. It is part of the California State University system and the only maritime academy on the United States West Coast. The university offers six bachelor's degree programs and one Master's degree program.

History

The California Nautical School was established in 1929, when California State Assembly Bill No. 253 was signed into law by Governor C. C. Young.  The bill authorized the creation of the school, the appointment of a board of governors to manage the school and the acquisition of a training vessel.  The school's mission was "to give practical and theoretical instruction in navigation, seamanship, steam engines, gas engines, and electricity in order to prepare young men to serve as officers in the American Merchant Marine." By 1930, a training vessel and a school site was acquired; the original site was in Tiburon in the San Francisco Bay Area.

Due to the Great Depression, the early days of the school were full of financial uncertainty. As early as 1933, some state legislators were calling for the school's abolition. To save money, cadets and instructors alike lived and held classes aboard the training vessel, the T.S. California State. Only after the passage of the Merchant Marine Act of 1936 did the funding for the school stabilize.

In 1939 the California Nautical School adopted the name, the California Maritime Academy.  By 1940, the academy was granting Bachelor of Science degrees and Naval Reserve commissions to its graduates; this step marked the beginning of the transition from the status of trade school to college. In 1943, the academy moved to its present location in Vallejo, California.

In the 1970s, after surviving another round of budget cuts and calls for the academy's abolition, California Maritime Academy became a four-year institution. The 1970s also marked the time when the first minority and female cadets graduated from California Maritime Academy.

In 1995 California Maritime Academy became the twenty-second campus of the California State University system.  The new affiliation improved the academy's funding prospects considerably. The current training vessel is the T.S. Golden Bear; it is the third training ship to carry that name.

In September 2015, the California State University Board of Trustees approved a new name, the California State University Maritime Academy.

Superintendents and presidents

Since the passage of the Merchant Marine Act of 1970, the position of President of the Cal Maritime is commissioned as a Rear Admiral (Upper Half) in the United States Maritime Service.  Two past presidents are alumni of the academy.

Dwyer replaced by Nichols due to Navy requirements for regular Navy officers to be in charge of Navy-owned ships
During WWII, Superintendent and Master became separate positions
Edwin C. Miller appointed Interim Superintendent October 1971 – July 1972
On February 27, 1975, the title of "Superintendent" was changed to "President"

Training ships

Academics

Degree programs
Cal Maritime offers one graduate and six undergraduate degrees, all of which are tied to a nautical curriculum. An additional Oceanography major was added in fall 2020. As of fall 2018 CSU Maritime had the largest enrollment percentage of Pacific Islander Americans and Multiracial Americans.

Rankings

Money magazine ranked Cal Maritime 15th in the country for value out of 623 schools it evaluated for its 2022 Best Colleges in America ranking.

In 2019 Forbes ranked Cal Maritime as the 309th top college in the nation and 64th in the West.

The 2021 U.S. News & World Report college rankings lists Cal Maritime as the No. 1 "Top Public College" and tied for 2nd out of 102 schools in the category "Regional Colleges (West)".

According to a study by the Equality of Opportunity Project, the Cal Maritime had the best results of any California college in helping transform students whose parents were relatively poor (bottom 20 percent of the income bracket) into adults who are relatively wealthy (top 20 percent income) within a decade after graduation.  85% of poor students eventually became relatively wealthy. However, only 6% of the students came from poor families.

Corps of Cadets

Cal Maritime is the United States' only maritime academy on the West Coast and requires all undergraduate students to participate in the Corps of Cadets.  The only similar program in the Western United States is at the junior college New Mexico Military Institute.  Since Maritime Academies comply with Title 46 Part 310 of the Code of Federal Regulations students are referred to as Cadets, required to wear uniforms, and utilize a demerit-based disciplinary system.  Participation in Navy Reserve Merchant Marine training program is no longer required, but Cadets still utilize Merchant Marine Navy-style uniforms, customs, and traditions.  Based on academic majors cadets are organized into Squads, Sections, Divisions and Companies which regularly muster in Morning Formations several times a week, as well as stand watches on campus and aboard the training ship.

Military options
There is no armed service obligation attached to graduation from the Cal Maritime. However, financial aid and additional career opportunities exist for those students who choose to participate in any of the several military programs available on the Cal Maritime campus:

Coast Guard – Auxiliary University Program, Maritime Academy Graduate Program
Navy – Strategic Sealift Officer Program
Navy – Reserve Officer Training Corps
Marine Corps – Reserve Officer Training Corps
Air Force – Reserve Officer Training Corps

Athletics
The Cal Maritime athletics teams are called the Keelhaulers (formerly known as the "Seawolves"). The academy is a member of the National Association of Intercollegiate Athletics (NAIA), primarily competing in the California Pacific Conference (Cal Pac) since the 1996–97 academic year.

Cal Maritime competes in 14 intercollegiate varsity sports: Men's sports include basketball, crew, cross country, golf, rugby, soccer and water polo; while women's sports include basketball, crew, cross country, golf, soccer and water polo; and co-ed sports include sailing.

History
Cal Maritime has a long history of athletic activities. Before it joined regular intercollegiate athletics, sports teams from Cal Maritime usually played military teams from local bases. In the 1970s, Cal Maritime began to organize its sports under intercollegiate guidelines, and the student body chose the "Keelhauler" as the academy's mascot. Until then, the Academy's teams were known as the Seawolves.

Mascot/nickname
The Keelhauler mascot was chosen as Cal Maritime's athletic mascot by cadets in 1974, the name taken from a form of corporal punishment that was formerly used in the Dutch and English navies. Keelhauling involved tying the hands of a crewmember to a rope and hauling him under the keel of the ship. While the practice of keelhauling was formally abolished in 1853, the Keelhauler lives on as the official mascot of Cal Maritime athletics.

Accomplishments
Cal Maritime's rugby program was started in 1998 and gained varsity status in 2001. Rugby was at one time the school's most successful sport, going undefeated against Division II opponents in home matches from 2007 to 2010. Cal Maritime's rugby team has been nationally ranked in college rugby, won the Pacific Coast League's Western Division Championship in 2009 and 2010, and was the runner up in the 2012 championship of the National Small College Rugby Organization. During the 2004–2005 academic year, the women's basketball team was formed and now also competes in the CalPac.

The academy's sailing team captured their first Kennedy Cup – the National Collegiate Sailing Championship – in the fall of 2009. That victory earned it the right to serve as the U.S. representative in the annual Student World Yachting Cup championships in October 2010 in La Rochelle, France, where it placed 5th of 14. 

The sailing team won the Kennedy Cup again in 2013, 2015, 2021 and 2022. 

In 2012, the Varsity 4+ of the men's crew team took first place in its event at the Head of the American Regatta. It beat teams from UC Berkeley, UC Davis, CSU Sacramento, CSU Long Beach, Humboldt State University, Saint Mary's College of California, Sonoma State University, and the University of the Pacific. At the 2013 WIRA championships, the men's pair placed 2nd out of 16, while the men's novice 4+ placed 6th out of 19.  Also in 2012, Cal Maritime added a men's cross country running team that finished 5th out of 8 teams in the Cal Pac Conference.

In 2014, Cal Maritime added a women's water polo team, followed by a women's soccer team in 2018.

Spirit 
In the fall of 2022, Cal Maritime Athletics formed a student run spirit group dubbed "The Watch", playing homage to "watch standing", the main duty of deck and engine officers on ships.

Notable alumni
 Kate McCue (Class of 2000), Celebrity Cruises Captain
Ryan T. Holte (Class of 2005), Judge, United States Court of Federal Claims
 Jamila Reinhardt (Class of 2012), rugby union player

See also

 United States Maritime Administration
 United States service academies
 Maritime Academy
 United States Merchant Marine
 Senior Military College

Notes

References

External links
 
 Official athletics website

 
Maritime colleges in the United States
Military academies of the United States
Universities and colleges in Solano County, California
San Pablo Bay
California Pacific Conference schools
Schools accredited by the Western Association of Schools and Colleges
Educational institutions established in 1929
1929 establishments in California
Schools in Vallejo, California
California State University Maritime Academy
Maritime Academy